Crispin School Academy is a secondary school in Street, Somerset. The school is located to the eastern end of Street and shares a campus with Strode College.

History 
Crispin School was formed in 1973 by the merger of Elmhurst Grammar School and Strode Secondary Modern School. In 1999, the school was awarded specialist technology status with a second specialism in music awarded in 2008.

Crispin School was converted to an academy in 2011, under the provisions of the Academies Act 2010.

Subjects offered 
Students in years 7 and 8 (key stage 3) can study the following subjects: English, Mathematics, Science, History, Geography, Beliefs and Values, Art, Drama, Food Technology, French, Graphics, ICT and Computing, Music, PSHE, PE, Textiles, and Resistant Materials. At the GCSE level, all students continue to study English, English Literature, Mathematics, Science (at least two GCSEs), Physical Education, and Society, Relationships and Values. Optional subjects include Geography, History, French, Spanish, German, Religious Studies, Art, Drama, Food and Nutrition, Graphics, Health and Social Care, ICT and Computing, Music, Media, Photography, Sport, Business Studies, Textiles and Resistant Materials.

Extracurricular activities 
Musical activities on offer to students include school choir, senior choir, orchestra and string group, all of which occur daily. The school also participates in an Annual Carol Service at Wells Cathedral, a joint Christmas Concert with Brookside Academy, a Spring Concert, and School of Rock Days.

School shows are performed at the nearby Strode Theatre. Recent productions include Tales of the Arabian Nights (2016), Oliver (2017), Alice (2018),  Find Me (2018), Bugsy Malone (2019) and Sister Act (2020).

Over the past six years, more than 90% of art and photography GCSE scores have been A*-C/4-9 The student works were displayed around Crispin. About half numbers of students choose either GCSEs in fine art or photography and some choose both. The GCSE Art and Photography Virtual Exhibition are held in the school.

Sports offered include handball, netball, rugby, and football as well as equestrian and triathlon.

Annual trips take place to galleries in London, Bristol Zoo and the Eden Project. Several residential trips take place, including ones to Iceland, France, Italy, New York, Swaziland, and Kenya. Crispin has a link with a school in Kenya and the 'Masana Block' is named in recognition of this link.

Houses 
In 2017 the school moved to a House system with 10 vertical tutor groups in each House. The Houses composed of four parts: Corvus, Falco, Sturnus and Tyto, the four names are derived from bird genera. Each House has a Head of House, a House Learning Coordinator and a House Captain voted for by the staff and students with the House. The school has weekly competitions to allow students to participate in their Houses, such as spelling bee contests, Tug of War and "Fastest Omelette".

Partner Primary School links 
Crispin has links to several Partner Primary Schools. Schools are invited into Crispin regularly to participate in subject-specific days to prepare them for Secondary School life.

Alumni 
Crispin School has an active alumni program with over 500 alumni registered with Future First. Alumni return to the school to deliver workshops for each year group about careers and raising aspirations. Notable alumni include:

 Helen Chamberlain – television presenter
 Beccy Huxtable – Producer and Co-Presenter of The Scott Mills Show on BBC Radio 1. 
 Jaye Jacobs – actress in Holby City, former deputy-head girl.

References

External links 
 

Academies in Somerset
Street, Somerset
Secondary schools in Somerset